Keith Simpson (17 July 1907 – 29 November 1964) was an  Australian rules footballer who played with South Melbourne in the Victorian Football League (VFL).

Notes

External links 

1907 births
1964 deaths
Australian rules footballers from Victoria (Australia)
Sydney Swans players